Dmitri Vladimirovich Pytlev (born 15 July 1987) is a Russian professional football player. He plays for FC Dynamo Vladivostok.

Club career
He made his Russian Football National League debut for FC Zvezda Irkutsk on 26 July 2008 in a game against FC Salyut-Energiya Belgorod.

External links
 
 

1987 births
Sportspeople from Irkutsk
Living people
Russian footballers
Association football defenders
FC Zvezda Irkutsk players
FC Yenisey Krasnoyarsk players
FC Neftekhimik Nizhnekamsk players
FC Baikal Irkutsk players